The 2014 Nevada gubernatorial election was held on Tuesday, November 4, 2014, to elect the Governor of Nevada. Incumbent Republican governor Brian Sandoval won re-election to a second term in office, defeating Democratic nominee Bob Goodman in a landslide. Sandoval won a higher percentage of the vote than any other incumbent governor in 2014. , this is the most recent time that the Republican candidate carried Clark County in a statewide race and the last time that an incumbent governor won reelection.

Republican primary

Candidates

Declared
 Edward Hamilton, businessman and candidate for the U.S. Senate in 2010
 Gary Marinch
 Brian Sandoval, incumbent governor
 William Tarbell
 Thomas Tighe

Declined
 Jim Gibbons, former governor
 Joe Heck, U.S. Representative (ran for re-election and won)
 Mike Montandon, former mayor of North Las Vegas and candidate for governor in 2010

Results

Democratic primary
For the first time in a gubernatorial election since it was added in 1975, the None of These Candidates option received a plurality of the votes. This has been ascribed to the eight Democratic candidates' lack of name recognition, money and political experience. High-profile Democrats were put off by Sandoval's popularity and large war chest, leading to no "serious challenger" emerging. According to state law, even if the "None of These Candidates" option receives the most votes in an election, the actual candidate who receives the most votes still wins the election. Thus, Bob Goodman was certified as the Democratic nominee.

Candidates

Declared
 Charles Chang
 Frederick Conquest, anthropology professor and candidate for governor in 2010
 Stephen Frye, psychiatrist and candidate for NV-03 in 2012
 Bob Goodman, former Economic Development Commissioner, former Wyoming economic development director and candidate for lieutenant governor in 2006 and 2010
 Chris Hyepock, casino manager
 Allen Rheinhart, painter, sculptor and writer
 John Rutledge, philanthropist and attorney
 Abdul Shabazz, denture repair business owner and candidate for Mayor of Las Vegas in 2011

Withdrew
 Fernando Lopes

Declined
 Richard Bryan, former U.S. Senator and former governor
 Barbara Buckley, former Speaker of the Nevada Assembly
 Catherine Cortez Masto, Nevada Attorney General
 Steven Horsford, U.S. Representative (ran for re-election and lost)
 Jan Laverty Jones, former mayor of Las Vegas, candidate for governor in 1994 and nominee for governor 1998
 Ruben Kihuen, state senator (ran for re-election and won)
 Susie Lee, education activist
 Kate Marshall, Nevada State Treasurer (ran for Secretary of State and lost)
 Ross Miller, Secretary of State of Nevada (ran for Nevada Attorney General and lost)
 Joe Neal, former state senator and nominee for governor in 2002
 Rory Reid, former Clark County Commissioner and nominee for governor in 2010
 Tick Segerblom, state senator
 Steve Sisolak, Clark County Commissioner
 Debbie Smith, state senator (ran for re-election and won)
 Dina Titus, U.S. Representative and nominee for governor in 2006 (ran for re-election and won)

Results

Independent American Party of Nevada primary

Candidates

Declared
David Lory VanDerBeek, family therapist and nominee for the Nevada Assembly in 2010 and the U.S. Senate in 2012

Green primary

Candidates

Withdrew
 David Gibson

Independents

Candidates

Withdrew
 Frederick Conquest, anthropology professor and Democratic candidate for governor in 2010 (ran as a Democrat)

General election

Candidates
 Brian Sandoval (Republican), incumbent governor of Nevada
 Bob Goodman (Democratic), former economic development commissioner, former Wyoming director of economic development and candidate for lieutenant governor in 2006 and 2010
 David Lory VanDerBeek (Independent American Party of Nevada), family therapist and nominee for the Nevada Assembly in 2010 and the U.S. Senate in 2012

Predictions

Polling

Results

References

External links
Nevada gubernatorial election, 2014 at Ballotpedia

Official campaign websites (Archived)
Brian Sandoval for Governor incumbent
Stephen Frye for Governor
Bob Goodman for Governor
Chris Hyepock for Governor
Gary Marinch for Governor
Allen Rheinhart for Governor
William Tarbell for Governor
Thomas Tighe for Governor
David Lory VanDerBeek for Governor

2014 Nevada elections
2014
2014 United States gubernatorial elections